Oh, What a Night is a 1992 comedy film, starring Corey Haim and Barbara Williams.

Plot
Two teenage boys are growing up in a small Canadian town in the summer of 1955. While their parents go about with their own concerns, the two develop an interest in girls. One tries to impress his crush with his father's cars. The other, seventeen-year-old Eric Hansen, becomes enamored with an older woman newly arrived in town.

Cast
 Corey Haim as Eric  
 Barbara Williams as Vera  
 Keir Dullea as Thorvald  
 Emilie-Claire Barlow as Lorraine 
 Geneviève Bujold as Eva  
 Andrew Miller as Donald  
 Kirsten Kieferle as Betty  
 Joseph Ziegler as Vern Rawlins  
 Robbie Coltrane as Todd  
 Denny Doherty as Harol

References

External links
 
 

1992 films
1992 romantic comedy films
1990s Canadian films
1990s English-language films
1990s teen comedy films
1990s teen romance films
Canadian romantic comedy films
Canadian teen comedy films
English-language Canadian films
Films directed by Eric Till
Films set in 1955